KK Andromedae, also known as HD 9531, is a variable star in the northern constellation of Andromeda. It has an apparent visual magnitude of 5.90, which places it near the lower limit of visibility to the naked eye even under good viewing conditions. An Alpha2 Canum Venaticorum variable, it varies in brightness by 0.012 magnitude every 0.66 days. At that distance, the brightness of the star is diminished by an extinction of 0.26 magnitude due to interstellar dust.

Cowley et al. (1969) assigned this star a stellar classification of B9 IV, which would indicate it is a B-type star in the subgiant stage that has exhausted the hydrogen supply at its core and is expanding. It is a catalogued as an Ap star that displays an abnormal silicon abundance, but has been reported to actually be a helium-weak  chemically peculiar star. The star has just over three times the mass of the Sun and about 2.7 times the Sun's radius. KK And is radiating 91 times the Sun's luminosity from its photosphere at an effective temperature of 11,729 K.

References

B-type subgiants
Alpha2 Canum Venaticorum variables
Ap stars
Andromeda (constellation)
Durchmusterung objects
009531
007321
0446
Andromedae, KK
Helium-weak stars